Sa'ib Khathir (died 683) was an influential Persian musician in the early days of the Umayyad Caliphate (661–750). A freedman (mawla), Sa'ib was responsible for introducing music to Medina. He was killed during the Battle of al-Harra.

References

Sources
 
 
 
 

Year of birth unknown
683 deaths
7th-century Iranian people
Iranian musicians
7th-century people from the Umayyad Caliphate